

Churches 
 St. Mary's Forane Church, Muttom, Cherthala P O, Alappuzha.
 St. George Church, Arthinkal- 8 km southwest from town on Cherthala-Thanky-Thumboly road
 St. Andrew's Basilica Church (Arthunkal palli), Arthinkal- 8 km southwest from town on Cherthala-Thumpoly-Alappuzha road
 St. Thomas Church, Thumpoly (Thumpoly Church). Alappuzha-Arthunkal-chellanam-kochi Coastal Road.
 St. Stephen's CSI Church, Kalavancodam
 St. Mary's Forane Church, Thankey -5 km north from Town on Cherthala-Thanky-Anthakaranazhi road
 St. Mary's Fornane Church, Pallippuram -8 km north from Town on Arookkutty road
 St. Thomas Church, Kizhakkummury, Chethala; 2 km from Cherthala KSRTC Bus Station, on Thannermukkom road
 St. Joseph's Church, Thirunnalloor. 5 km north  from Cherthala Town on Arookutty road
 St. Augustine Church and Pontifical Seminary, Manapuram - 15 km north from Town on Arukutty-Cherthala road
 St. Thomas Church, Kokkamangalam - 6 km southeast from town on Cherthala-Thanneermukkom-Muhamma road
 St. Martín de Porres Church, Vadakkumuri- 2 km west from town near Kizhekkenalpathil
 St. Sebastian's Church, Maruthorvattom, NH 66,4 km from Cherthala
 St. Joseph church, kuncharam, Panavally, north Cherthala
 St. Ann's Church, Uzhuva, Kalavamkodam, Cherthala
 Little flower church, Ayiramtahi, Thayckal. 8 km southwest from town on Cherthala-Thanky-Thumboly road
 St. Francis Assisi Church, Thyckal. 8 km southwest from town on Cherthala-Thanky-Thumboly road
 St. Joseph's Church, Thuravoor
 St. Michael's Church, Kavil, Pattanakad P. O. 8 km from ckerthala town con. 9947166161.
 St. Joseph Church, Kunnumpuram, Pattanakad P.O Cherthala.
 St. Antony's Church, Muttathiparambu, Cherthala
 St. Thomas Church, Nedumbrakkad, Cherthala

Mosques 
 Cherthala Town Central Juma Masjid, Near Manorama Kavala, Cherthala
 Thaickal Juma Masjid, Thaickal, Cherthala
Aroor Mahal Muslim jamath near Chandiroor new bridge
Jeelani Masjid Eramalloor
Chandiroor Palam Masjid
Varekatt Juma Masjid Chandiroor
Masjidul Aman Aroor
Karukathala Thaykkavu Chandiroor
Rifaee Juma Masjid Eramalloor
Fareediya Masjid Chandiroor
Kaithavalappu Thaykkavu Chandiroor
Kattupuram Palli Juma Masjid, Vaduthala Jetty
Huda Masjid, Vaduthala Jetty
Ansar Masjid, Arookutty
Hidayathul Islam Masjid, Hidayath Jn., Vaduthala Jetty
Kombanamury Masjid, Arookutty
Town Juma Masjid, Vaduthala Jn.
Masjidul Manar, Puthiyalapalam
Nadvathul Islam Masjid, Naduvath Nagar

Temples 
 Kothakattu  Sree Dharma sastha Temple- Kokkothamangalam 
 Sree Shanmukha Vilasam Kshethram Near Manaveli Jn.2 km from NH47
 Karthayayani Devi Temple, at the heart of Chertala town
 Padinjare Kottaram SreeDharmasastha Temple, 3km West from Chertala town
 Kollapally Sree Maheswaripuram Temple (Sree Chakra Prathishtta) 5 km North of Cherthala town
 Kandamangalam Sree Rajarajeshwari Temple, Kadakkarappally.
 Sakthi Vinayaka Temple, Thankey Jn, Kadakkarappally
 Velorvattom Mahadevar Temple, Velorvattom, 1 km West of Cherthala town
 Puthumana Sree Krishna Swamy Temple
 Sree Shanmuka Swamy Temple, Cherthala CMC 23
 Kuttikattu Sree Bhadra Kali Devi Temple
 Muttathu Thirumala Devasom Lakshmi Narasimha Temple, Chertala town
 Varanaadu Bhagavathy Temple, Varanaadu
 Kottaram Sri Dharmasastha Temple, Near Ottapunna, NH47 bypass
 Kadambanadu Sri Devi Temple, CMC-1, Cherthala
 Maruthorvattom Sree Dhanvanthri Temple, Maruthorvattom
 Vellappally Sree Dharma Daiva Kshetram, Maruthorvattom
 Kandmangalam Devi temple, Kandmangalam, 4 km from Town on Cherthala-Thanky-Anthakaranazhi road
 Mutharamman Kovil, near railway station
 Nalpathenneeswaram Sree Mahadeva Temple, Panavally -One of the 108 Shiva temples supposed to be built by Parasurama
 Thrichattukulam Mahadeva Temple, Panavally
 Marappallil Devi Temple, Perumpalam Junction, Panavally
 Thiruvizha Sree Mahadevar Temple, Tiruvizha
 Thuruthummel Paradevatha Temple, Thiruvizha
 Alunkal Althara sree Krishna SwamiTemple, Thiruvizha 18 Jn, Thiruvizha
 Parassery Paradevatha Temple, Thiruvizha
 Kochiravely Dakshinamoorthy Temple, Thiruvizha North
 Kunnath Sri Khandakarna Temple, Cherthala South
 Mavunkal Gopalakrishna Swami Temple, Kanichukulagara PO, Thiruvizha
 Varakadi Sree Parvathy Devi Temple
 Mahadevar Temple, Mararikulam
 Kayikkara Temple
 Thayyil Sakthipuram Temple
 Ayyappanchery Dharma Sastha Temple
 Thycattuserry Bhagavathy Remple, Thycattussery
 Sreekandeswaram Mahadevar Temple, Poochakkal
 Mahadevar Temple, Pattanakkad, 6 km North of town on NH 47 - One of the 108 Shiva temples supposed to be built by Parasurama
 Kanichukulangara devi temple, Kanichukulanghara
 Thuravoor Narashimha Moorthy-Sudharshana Moorthy Mahakshethram, Thuravoor, 12 km North of town on NH 47
 Thuravoor Tirumala Devasom Lakshmi Narasimha Temple, Thuravoor
 Nalukulanghara Bhagavathi Temple, Parayakad, Thuravoor
 Karthayayani Devi temple- Aroor - 20 km North of town on NH 47
 Sree Palliyarakkavu Devi Temple, Aroor.
 Kalavancodam Saktheeswara Temple, famous for kannadi prathista, 6 km north on Kalavancodam-Saktheeswara road
 Sivasubrahmanyapuram Temple, Nadubhagom, Thycattussery
 Kadambanakulangra Temple, Pallippuram
 Subrahmanya Temple, Puthanambalam
 Kochanakulangara Bhagavathy Temple, Kayippuram, Muhamma
 Nagamkulangara Temple, Vayalar
 Puthiyakavu Devi Temple, Puthiyakavu, Uzhuva
 Chammanad Devi Temple, Chammanad
 Kizhakke Chammanad Durga Devi Temple, Chammanad
 Punnakkezhil Devi Temple, Thycattussery
 Lakshmi Narayana Temple, 1 km west of Manorama Jn.
 Vazatharaveli Annapoorneswari Temple, Panavally
 Arackal Naga Raja Temple, Near Koottuveli, Mayithara
 Sooryankunnu Bhadrakali Temple, Panavally
 Mutharamman Kovil, Kambikkal junction, Cherthala town
 Pallippuram Kadavil Sree Maha Lekshmi Temple, Pallippuram
 Kadathuruth Srimahadavi Temple, Valamngalam, Thuravoor
 Shree Bhadra vilasam vadakkumkara temple, K.R. Puram
 Cheruvaranam sreenarayanapuram temple, Cheruvaranam (Puthanambalam)
 Vijnana Sandhayani Shree Mahavishnu temple, SNDP Br. No. 715 Cherthala
 Parambil Bhadrakaali Temple near Koottuveli
 Devankal Mahavishnu Temple, Puthiyakavu
 Puthiyakavu Devi Temple
 Sasthankal Sree Darmasastha Temple, Puthiyakavu
 chettichaveedu devi Temple kannankara
 Thiruayranikkulam Kalathil Mahadeva temple pallippuram
 vellimuttam sreedhrma sastha temple
 Vilanjoor Mahadeva Temple Kodamthuruth, Kuthiathode

References

Religious buildings and structures in Alappuzha district